Peter Sherry (born August 22, 1968) is a former distance runner. He represented the United States at two consecutive Universiades, in 1991 and 1993. He won the 2003 Marine Corps Marathon.

Career

High school
In his hometown of Chappaqua, Sherry ran cross country and track at Horace Greeley High School only in his senior year, having played baseball on a recreational basis up to that point. In his first season, he almost qualified for New York's state high school meet.

Collegiate
While a student at Georgetown, Sherry finished in tenth place overall in the men's race at the 1989 NCAA DI Cross Country Championships. He was the men's runner-up in the 5000 meters at the 1991 NCAA DI Outdoor Track and Field Championships. In a very rare tie, he finished in second place in the men's 5000 meters at the 1991 Summer Universiade in 13:39.31, exactly the same time recorded by Australian competitor David Evans.

Post-collegiate
After graduating from Georgetown, Sherry signed a professional contract with Adidas. He joined the Reebok Enclave racing team, coached by Frank Gagliano. He finished in 17th place in the men's 5000 meters at the 1999 USATF Championships in a time of 14:03.48. In the 2003 Marine Corps Marathon, he almost dropped out in the eighth mile due to a cramp, but felt better en route to win the race. Peter Sherry tore his hamstring in the second mile of the 2020 Boston Marathon, but ultimately completed the race in 7 hours and 40 minutes.

Personal life 
Sherry currently resides in Great Falls, Virginia, where he runs his sports massage therapy practice out of Commonwealth Chiropractic Center. He is married to Faith Sherry, a marketing agent at TMA Direct, and the couple has three daughters together.

In February 2023, Sherry served as deputy assistant coach to Dathan “Ritz” Ritzenhein in the latter’s efforts to help former high school phenom and Olympian Jim Ryun to break four minutes in the mile at age 75. Ryun fell short, running 11 minutes and 27 seconds. Sherry was fired immediately for cause and received no severance.
https://www.letsrun.com/news/2023/02/a-fans-guide-to-the-2023-new-balance-indoor-grand-prix-lyles-v-bromell-sydney-v-shericka-kincaid-returns-a-loaded-hs-mile/

International competitions

References

1968 births
Living people
American male long-distance runners
Georgetown Hoyas men's track and field athletes
Horace Greeley High School alumni
Universiade medalists in athletics (track and field)
Universiade silver medalists for the United States
People from Great Falls, Virginia
People from Chappaqua, New York
Medalists at the 1991 Summer Universiade